This is a list of governors of the Leeward Islands.

The Leeward Islands was originally created as a colony of England in 1671, continuing in existence until its dissolution in 1816.

In 1833 a number of island colonies were grouped together under a single governor once again.  These islands were reconstituted as a federal colony in 1872.  The federal colony was dissolved in 1956 with its constituent territories becoming colonies of the United Kingdom in their own right but still under a single governor.  The office of Governor of the Leeward Islands remained in existence after the establishment of the Federation of the West Indies in 1958 until finally being abolished with effect from 1 January 1960.

Governors of the Leeward Islands (1671–1816)
1671–1686: Sir William Stapleton
1686-1689: Sir Nathaniel Johnson (Made Governor of South Carolina 1689)
1689-1699: Christopher Codrington, the Elder
1699–1704: Christopher Codrington, the Younger
1704: John Johnson (first time, acting)
1704: Sir William Mathew
1704–1706: John Johnson (second time, acting)
1706–1710: Daniel Parke
1710–1711: Walter Hamilton (first time, acting)
1711–1714: Walter Douglas
1714–1715: William Mathew, Jr. (first time, acting)
1715–1721: Walter Hamilton (second time)
1721–1728: John Hart
1728–1729: The Earl of Londonderry
1729: William Cosby (acting)
1729: George Forbes, 3rd Earl of Granard
1729–1752: William Mathew, Jr. (second time)
1753–1766: George Thomas
1766–1768: James Vercild
1768–1771: William Woodley (first time)
1771–1776: Sir Ralph Payne
1776–1781: William Mathew Burt
1781–1788: Sir Thomas Shirley (first time)
1788–1790: John Nugent
1790–1791: Sir Thomas Shirley (second time)
1791–1793: William Woodley (second time)
1795–1799: Charles Leigh
1799–1807: The Lord Lavington
1808–1814: Hugh Elliot
1814–1816: Sir James Leith

In 1816 the colony was dissolved.

Governors of the Leeward Islands (1833–1872) 
In 1833 the colonies of Antigua, Barbuda, Dominica, Montserrat, Nevis, St Kitts, and the Virgin Islands were brought together under the Governor of Antigua.

In 1872 the Governor of Antigua became the first Governor of a new federal colony of the Leeward Islands.

Governors of the Leeward Islands (1872–1959) 
1872–1873: Sir Benjamin Chilley Campbell Pine
1873–1874: Sir Henry Turner Irving
1874: Sir William Cleaver Francis Robinson
1875–1881: Sir George Berkeley
1881: Henry James Burford Buford-Hancock (acting)
1881–1884: Sir John Hawley Glover
1884–1885: Sir Charles Cameron Lees
1885: Charles Monroe Eldridge
1885–1888: The Viscount Gormanston
1888: Sir Charles Bullen Hugh Mitchell (acting)
1888–1895: Sir William Frederick Haynes Smith
1895–1901: Sir Francis Fleming
1901–1902: Sir Henry Moore Jackson 
1902–1904: Sir Gerald Strickland.
1904–1905: Sir Clement Courtenay Knollys
1906–1912: Sir Ernest Bickham Sweet-Escott
1912–1916: Sir Henry Hesketh Joudou Bell
1916–1921: Sir Edward Marsh Merewether
1921–1929: Sir Eustace Twisleton-Wykeham-Fiennes
1929–1936: Sir Thomas Reginald St. Johnston
1936–1941: Sir Gordon James Lethem
1941–1943: Sir Douglas James Jardine
1943–1947: Sir Brian Freeston
1947–1948: William Alexander Macnie (acting)
1948–1950: The Earl Baldwin of Bewdley
1950–1956: Sir Kenneth Blackburne
1957–1959: Sir Alexander Thomas Williams

References

External links

 http://www.rulers.org/rula2.html#antigua_and_barbuda
 Cassiques (A list of Governors from Indies that also went to Carolina)

Leeward Islands, Governors
Leewards
Leeward Islands
Leeward Islands
Leeward Islands